Tim Kelley (born May 20, 1986) is a former American alpine ski racer. He was born in Burlington, Vermont to former alpine skier Lindy Cochran and her husband Steve Kelley. His siblings Jessica Kelley and Robby Kelley both raced on the US Ski Team.

He competed at the 2015 World Championships in Beaver Creek, US, in the slalom.

World Cup results

References

External links

1986 births
American male alpine skiers
Living people
Sportspeople from Burlington, Vermont
Vermont Catamounts skiers